Lloyd Suh is an American playwright and the recipient of the 2019 Herb Alpert Award in the Arts in theatre. He is originally from Indianapolis, Indiana.

Career 
His plays include: The Chinese Lady, Charles Francis Chan Jr's Exotic Oriental Murder Mystery, Franklinland, the Wong Kids in the Secret of the Space Chupacabra Go!, American Hwangap, Jesus in India, Great Wall Story and others. These plays have been performed in the United States with Ma-Yi, the Play Company, Ensemble Studio Theatre, La Mama ETC, Magic Theatre and the Denver Center Theatre Company. They have been performed internationally at the Cultural Center of the Philippines in Manila and with the PCPA in Seoul, Korea. Starting in 2015, he has been a member of the Dramatists Guild Council. He joined The Lark as the Director of Artistic Programs in 2011. From 2005 to 2010 he was the Artistic Director of Second Generation and Co-Director of the Ma-Yi Writers Lab.

Suh was on the National Steering Committee for the creation of the first National Asian American Theatre Conference and the first National Asian American Theatre Festival.

He is an alum of EST's Youngblood and the Soho Rep Writer Director Lab. He received his BA from Indiana University and his MFA from the New School for Social Research.

Awards 
In 2016, Suh received the Helen Merrill Award and in 2019 he was the recipient of the Herb Alpert Award in the Arts. He was named one of the "50 to Watch" by the Dramatists Guild. In 2020 he was awarded a John Simon Guggenheim Memorial Foundation Fellow Award.

References 

21st-century American dramatists and playwrights
21st-century American male writers
Year of birth missing (living people)
Living people
American male dramatists and playwrights
Writers from Indianapolis